Patrick McCabe Buckley (born 12 August 1946) is a Scottish former footballer, who manages Musselburgh Youngstars 17s and played for Wolverhampton Wanderers, Sheffield United and Rotherham United.

Career
Buckley began his career at Third Lanark in his native Scotland before joining English First Division side Wolverhampton Wanderers in 1964. He made his senior debut for the club on 30 September 1964 in a 0–2 loss to Birmingham City. He made 15 appearances during his first season at Molineux, scoring three times, but failing to halt relegation.

He left in 1968, after 29 league appearances in total for them. He joined Sheffield United, and ended his league career with a brief spell at Rotherham United. Buckley later moved into non-league management, firstly with Kiveton Park FC, then Sheffield FC, Retford Town FC, and Gainsborough Trinity, before moving to Goole Town in 1986. 

Buckley also was a newsagent for a time, owning a shop in his adopted home of Worksop, before returning home to Scotland in the 1990's. 

His father, Patrick (known as Paddy) was also a footballer. His younger brother Graham was also a professional player in the Scottish Leagues - with clubs such as Cowdenbeath, Brechin City, Arbroath and Berwick Rangers.

References

1946 births
Living people
People from Leith
Scottish footballers
English Football League players
Third Lanark A.C. players
Wolverhampton Wanderers F.C. players
Sheffield United F.C. players
Rotherham United F.C. players
United Soccer Association players
Los Angeles Wolves players
Preston Athletic F.C. players
Kiveton Park F.C. players
Goole Town F.C. managers
Retford Town F.C. managers
Sydney Olympic FC players
Scottish expatriate footballers
Scottish expatriate sportspeople in the United States
Scottish expatriate sportspeople in Australia
Expatriate soccer players in the United States
Expatriate soccer players in Australia
Association football midfielders
Gainsborough Trinity F.C. managers
Scottish football managers
Footballers from Edinburgh